Laura Wegener Parfrey is a Canadian bioscientist, focusing on microbial ecology. , she is a Canada Research Chair in Protist Ecology at the University of British Columbia.

Her work has two distinct strands: the microbial ecology of the mammalian gut and coastal microbial ecosystems.

Career
Wegener Parfrey earned her Bachelor of Science degree in 2004 from the University at Albany, SUNY and her PhD in 2011 from the University of Massachusetts Amherst, with a thesis entitled Diversity of Eukaryotes and Their Genomes

References

External links

Year of birth missing (living people)
Living people
Academic staff of the University of British Columbia
Canadian ecologists
Women ecologists
University at Albany, SUNY alumni
University of Massachusetts Amherst College of Natural Sciences alumni
University of Colorado Boulder alumni
Canada Research Chairs
Canadian microbiologists
21st-century Canadian women scientists